Biddlecombe is a surname of Anglo-Saxon English origin. Notable people with the surname include:

George Biddlecombe (1807–1878), English naval officer and author
Terry Biddlecombe (1941–2014), English National Hunt racing jockey in the 1960s and 1970s
William Biddlecombe, Mayor of, and MP for, Poole, England

See also
Biddlecomb, surname